CCLM may refer to:
Clinical Chemistry and Laboratory Medicine, a scientific journal
Coordinating Council of Literary Magazines, former name for "Council of Literary Magazines and Presses", an American organization of independent literary publishers and magazines